"Rise" is a song by English singer Gabrielle. It was written by Gabrielle, Ollie Dagois and Ferdy Unger-Hamilton and produced by Jonny Dollar for her same-titled third studio album (1999). Notable for a rare authorised use of a Bob Dylan sample, it takes extensively from his 1973 song "Knockin' on Heaven's Door". Dylan liked "Rise" so much he allowed Gabrielle to use the sample free, while receiving a co-writer credit for providing the song's chord progression and vocal sample.

Released as the second single from the album, the song reached number one on the UK Singles Chart for two weeks in January 2000, becoming her second chart-topper. "Rise" also reached number one in Ireland and charted highly in Austria, Iceland, Norway and New Zealand, where it reached number two in April and May 2000 and ended the year as the country's third-best-selling single.

Music video
The music video for "Rise" features Gabrielle as a spectator viewing a boxing match. The video was directed by Kevin Godley and was shot in late 1999.

Track listings

Credits and personnel
Credits are lifted from the Rise album booklet.

Studios
 Produced at Westside Studios (London, England)
 Mixed at Master Rock Studios (London, England)

Personnel

 Bob Dylan – writing ("Knockin' on Heaven's Door")
 Gabrielle – writing, vocals
 Ferdy Unger-Hamilton – writing
 Ollie Dagois – writing
 Sharon Scott – backing vocals
 Toyin Adekale – backing vocals
 Derrick Cross – backing vocals
 Doctor Gregory X – Hammond
 London Session Orchestra – strings
 Jonny Dollar – all other instruments, production
 Simon Richmond – all other instruments, co-production
 Wil Malone – string arrangement
 Craig Silvey – mixing

Charts and certifications

Weekly charts

Year-end charts

Certifications

Release history

References

1999 songs
2000 singles
Gabrielle (singer) songs
Go! Beat singles
Irish Singles Chart number-one singles
Music videos directed by Kevin Godley
Song recordings produced by Jonny Dollar
Songs written by Bob Dylan
Songs written by Gabrielle (singer)
UK Singles Chart number-one singles
Universal Music Group singles